Rafael Clavero Prados (born 10 February 1977) is a Spanish retired professional footballer who played as a left-back.

Club career
Born in Córdoba, Andalusia, Clavero spent the vast majority of his career in the Segunda División. His La Liga output consisted of one season with CD Numancia, one with Real Murcia and two with CA Osasuna, for a total of 62 games in the competition.

In the 2005–06 campaign, Clavero started in 21 of his 22 league appearances for the latter club, who finished in a best-ever fourth position with the subsequent qualification for the UEFA Champions League.

References

External links

1977 births
Living people
Spanish footballers
Footballers from Córdoba, Spain
Association football defenders
La Liga players
Segunda División players
Segunda División B players
Córdoba CF players
CP Mérida footballers
Real Madrid Castilla footballers
CD Numancia players
Real Murcia players
CA Osasuna players
CD Tenerife players
FC Cartagena footballers
SD Huesca footballers
Lucena CF players